King Edward VI Handsworth Grammar School for Boys, formerly and commonly Handsworth Grammar School, is a grammar school that admits boys from the age of eleven (as well as girls in the sixth form, since September 1997). The school was founded in 1862 and is located in Handsworth, Birmingham, England. it is situated just off the A41, near the junction with the A4040. King Edward Handsworth Grammar School is sometimes abbreviated as HGS. The headmaster is Simon N Bird.

In September 2017, the school was admitted into the Foundation of the Schools of King Edward VI, where it was renamed King Edward VI Handsworth Grammar School for Boys.

The school has five houses: Henry, William, Nelson, Galahad and Alfred

Notable former pupils

 William McKay Aitken (born 1934), Scottish-born Indian writer and explorer, resident in the Himalayas since 1960
 Kadeer Ali (born 1983), English cricketer 
 Ian Bateman (born 1961), British academic and Professor of Environmental Economics at the University of East Anglia
 Corey Blackett-Taylor (born 1997), footballer for Aston Villa F.C.
 Sir David Cox (1924–2022), British statistician
 Nigel Fortune (1924–2009), British scholar of music
 Denis Howell, Baron Howell (1923–1998), British Labour Party politician, Member of Parliament (MP), and life peer
 Eddie Hughes (born 1968), Conservative Member of Parliament
 Jason John (born 1971), English athlete
 Adil Ray (born 1974), comedian
 Mark Rowley (born 1964), senior British police officer
 Siôn Simon (born 1968), British Labour Party politician, Member of Parliament (MP) from 2001 to 2010, Member of the European Parliament (MEP) since 2014
 John Tooze (born 1938), scientist
 Robert Weir (born 1961), English discus and hammer thrower
 Harry B. Whittington (1916–2010), British palaeontologist and academic, Woodwardian Professor of Geology at the University of Cambridge from 1966 to 1983
 Joe Wilson (1861–1952), English footballer

References

External links
 
 EduBase
 Ofsted inspection report February 2002
 Ofsted inspection report October 2009

Boys' schools in the West Midlands (county)
Educational institutions established in 1862
1862 establishments in England
Grammar schools in Birmingham, West Midlands
Academies in Birmingham, West Midlands
Handsworth, West Midlands